Yuruby Rosaura Alicart Ramírez (born August 25, 1985) is a Venezuelan softball player. She competed for Venezuela at the 2008 Summer Olympics.

Alicart played college softball at Florida State University.

References

1985 births
Living people
Olympic softball players of Venezuela
Florida State Seminoles softball players
Softball players at the 2008 Summer Olympics
Competitors at the 2013 World Games
World Games silver medalists
World Games medalists in softball